The jazz big band album 
 is the eighth audio recording released by the Toshiko Akiyoshi Jazz Orchestra featuring Lew Tabackin. It was released in 2001 by Video Arts Music in Japan and True Life in the USA. Tracks 2-7 form the "Hiroshima - Rising From The Abyss" Suite.

Track listing
All songs composed and orchestrated by Toshiko Akiyoshi:
 "Long Yellow Road" – 1:53
 "Futility – Tragedy" – 15:30
 "Futility – Tragedy"
 "Survivor Tales" – 21:16
 "Survivor Tales"
 "Survivor Tales"
 "Hope" – 6:10
 "Wishing Peace" – 7:45

Personnel
 Toshiko Akiyoshi – piano
 Lew Tabackin – tenor saxophone, flute
 Tom Christensen  – tenor saxophone, flute
 Dave Pietro – alto saxophone, flute
 Jim Snidero – alto saxophone, flute
 Scott Robinson – baritone saxophone, bass clarinet
 Mike Ponella – trumpet
 Jim O'Conner – trumpet
 John Eckert – trumpet
 Jim Rotondi – trumpet
 Scott Whitfield – trombone
 Steve Armour – trombone
 Pat Hallaran – trombone
 Tim Newman – bass trombone
 Paul Gill – bass
 Andy Watson – drums
 Valtinho – percussion
Special guests:
 George Kawaguchi – drums
 Jang-Hyun Won – traditional Korean flute (daegeum)
 Ryoko Shigemori – reading

References

Video Arts Music VACM-1189
True Life Entertainment TLE-1000082

External links
Larry Appelbaum review in JazzTimes magazine, 2003 July/August issue.
All About Jazz review 2003 October 12
Wall Street Journal article by 

Toshiko Akiyoshi – Lew Tabackin Big Band albums
2001 live albums